The International Short Film Festival Oberhausen, founded in 1954, is one of the oldest short film festivals in the world. Held in Oberhausen, it is one of the major international platforms for the short form. The festival holds an International Competition, German Competition, and International Children's and Youth Film Competition, as well as the MuVi Award for best German music video and, since 2009, the NRW Competition for productions from the German state of North Rhine-Westphalia.

Oberhausen is known today for its extensive thematic programmes such as "Memories Can't Wait. Film without Film" (2014), "The Language of Attraction. Trailers between Advertising and the Avant-garde" (2019), "Solidarity as Disruption" (2021/22) or "Synchronize. Pan-African Film Networks" (2022). The festival in addition offers visitors a well-equipped Video Library, operates a non-commercial short-film distribution service and owns an archive of short films from over 70 years of cinema history.

History 
The International Short Film Festival Oberhausen was founded in 1954 by the director of the Oberhausen Volkshochschule (adult education centre), Hilmar Hoffmann, in association with the Filmclub Oberhausen under the name "1st West German Educational Film Festival". The event was initially geared to fulfilling an educational policy mandate and the motto chosen for the first festival was hence "Cultural Film – Route to Education". Featured were 45 films from the Federal Republic of Germany, France and the USA.

At the 4th West German Educational Film Festival in 1958, the motto "Way to the Neighbour" was introduced, under which the festival took place until 1997. In 1959, the festival was rechristened "West German Short Film Festival". Oberhausen soon made a political name for itself, chiefly because many films produced in the Eastern Bloc could only be viewed in Oberhausen, a situation that led to the festival's rapid ascent and its reputation as "short film mecca". As early as the 1950s, however, visitors were also treated to works by young filmmakers from the West such as François Truffaut, Norman McLaren, Alain Resnais, Bert Haanstra, and Lindsay Anderson. At the fourth festival in 1958, 190 films from 29 countries were already included in the programme.

At the eighth festival in 1962, a group of young German filmmakers, among them Alexander Kluge, Peter Schamoni and Edgar Reitz, issued the Oberhausen Manifesto, pronouncing the "old" film dead and declaring their aspiration to create a new kind of German film.

The 1960s then culminated in a 1968 scandal surrounding Hellmuth Costard's film Besonders wertvoll, in which a talking penis criticized the new Film Funding Act of 1967. Responding to an objection issued by the public prosecutor's office, the festival removed the film from the official programme, whereupon many German filmmakers withdrew their works from the festival. Oberhausen emerged from the crisis with an amended set of regulations, including a public selection procedure for German films.

In the 1970s, the women's movement was a touchstone at the festival, with young filmmakers such as Chantal Akerman and Helma Sanders-Brahms showing their first films in Oberhausen. With its Children's and Youth Cinema, the festival inaugurated a new competition category in 1978. The 1970s also witnessed a wave of new festivals: ousted from the cinema, the short form found new screening options in the festival arena.

In the late 1980s, video and new media began to gradually come onto the scene at Oberhausen. With the subsidence of the East/West conflict that had shaped the festival's early years, its role as "window to the East" slowly faded. Now, the festival's profile as mediator and trailblazer between the worlds of short film and advertising clip, music video, industrial film, and video art – often subsumed under the generic term avant-garde – came to the fore.

In 1991, the festival was renamed the International Short Film Festival Oberhausen, the name it still bears today. That same year, Oberhausen introduced the nation's first competition for German short film. Since 1993, the festival has given film and video equal standing in its competitions. In 1999, Oberhausen introduced the first film-festival award for music videos anywhere in the world, known as the "MuVi", which is still today awarded exclusively to directors for the visual quality of their clips. With the rise of video art, more and more films made by artists have found their way into the festival programmes.

Today, Oberhausen presents short films and videos originating from a wide range of formal, cultural and social backgrounds. Large-scale special programmes take up a different theme each year, most recently "The Language of Attraction. Trailers between Advertising and the Avant-garde" (2019), "Solidarity as Disruption" (2021/22) or "Synchronize. Pan-African Film Networks (2022). The festival also maintains a Video Library featuring a large selection of recent international short films, regularly mounts, among others, profile programmes dedicated to individual artists and Market Screenings for international distributors of avant-garde film, and each year, hosts a discussion series called "Podium".

Due to the Corona pandemic in 2020, the Festival organised its 66th edition completely online, making it the first exclusively digital film festival in Germany. With over 2,500 festival passes sold and users in nearly 100 countries, the new format proved far more successful than expected. This was followed in 2021, too, by another all-digital festival edition. The 67th International Short Film Festival Oberhausen took place online from 1 to 10 May. At ten days, the Festival was almost double its usual length and presented for the first time three new online competitions (International Online Competition, German Online Competition and Muvi International Award). In 2022, the Festival returned to the cinemas with a hybrid edition, playing exclusively online from 29 April to 3 May and in the cinemas from 4 to 10 May.

Besides organizing the festival, Oberhausen operates a non-commercial short film distribution service and its own archive holding short films from over 70 years of film history.

Careers 

During the long history of the Oberhausen festival, many careers got off to a successful start. A few of the filmmakers and artists who showed their early works in Oberhausen:

Eija-Liisa Ahtila
Doug Aitken
Kenneth Anger
Andrea Arnold
Jürgen Böttcher
Stan Brakhage
Vera Chytilová
Valie Export
Miloš Forman
Werner Herzog
Christoph Hochhäusler
Hermine Huntgeburth
Joris Ivens
Isaac Julien
Miranda July
Romuald Karmakar

Jan Lenica
Chris Marker
Bjørn Melhus

Roman Polanski
Pipilotti Rist
Christoph Schlingensief
Martin Scorsese
István Szabó
Agnès Varda
Adolf Winkelmann

Chronology 
 1954: Founded as Westdeutsche Kulturfilmtage
 1958: Introduction of the motto "Weg zum Nachbarn"
 1959: Renamed as Westdeutsche Kurzfilmtage
 1962: Oberhausen Manifesto
 1970: First computer-animated film
 1989: Introduction of a video section
 1991: Renamed as Internationale Kurzfilmtage Oberhausen; launch of the first German short film competition ever
 1993: All competitions are opened for video productions to compete on an equal footing with film
 1999: First film festival music video award in the world introduced
 2002: Co-founder of the AG Kurzfilm e.v., the lobbying organisation for German short film
 2019: Co-founder of AG Filmfestival, the lobbying organisation for German film festivals

Numbers 
 Almost 7,000 submissions from around 90 countries annually
 Approximately 500 films shown at each festival
 More than 1,000 accredited international visitors annually
 Awards totalling more than 41,000 €
 Accredited by the FIAPF since 1960
 Reference festival of the Academy of Motion Picture Arts and Sciences
 Nominating festival British Academy Film Awards and European Film Award of the European Film Academy

Festival directors 
 1954–1970: Hilmar Hoffmann
 1971–1975: Will Wehling
 1975–1985: Wolfgang J. Ruf
 1985–1990: Karola Gramann
 1990–1997: Angela Haardt 
 Since 1997:

External links 

The international short film festival in Oberhausen 2011 - a recapitulation
sensesofcinema.com

Annual events in Germany
Film festivals in Germany
Oberhausen
Short film festivals
Film festivals established in 1954
1954 establishments in West Germany
Culture of North Rhine-Westphalia
Tourist attractions in Oberhausen